Spy Pictures was established in 1999 as a London based production company making short films, commercials, music promos and title sequences, mainly animated. The company is owned and run by the founding directors Stephen Cavalier and Patrick Beirne, who before Spy Pictures each had over ten years experience in the animation, film and video game industries.

Series work includes all animation for series two of Modern Toss, work on Tommy Zoom for BBC, Monkey Dust for Talkback and 8 Minute Expert for Discovery and music videos have included the bands Laika and Ian Wills and the Willing. In 2001 the short film Daddy, written and directed by Stephen Cavalier at Spy Pictures, won the Mesh award for digital animation at the Edinburgh Film Festival.

References

1999 establishments in England
British animation studios
Mass media companies established in 1999